The 24th Japan Record Awards were held December 31, 1982. They recognized accomplishments by musicians from this year.

Award winners 
Japan Record Award:
Takashi Hosokawa for "Kita Sakaba"
Best Vocalist:
Junko Ohashi
Best New Artist:
Shibugakitai

References
Complete list of all winners 

Japan Record Awards
Japan Record Awards
Japan Record Awards
Japan Record Awards
1982